J. E. Coffland was a member of the Wisconsin State Assembly.

Biography
Coffland was born on February 12, 1864, in Ohio. Later, he established a clothing and furnishing goods business in Richland Center, Wisconsin. He died on June 10, 1929.

Political career
Coffland was a member of the Assembly during the 1903 and 1905 sessions. Previously, he had been elected as a member of the county board of Richland County, Wisconsin in 1895 and as Mayor of Richland Center in 1902 and 1904. He was a Democrat.

References

People from Richland Center, Wisconsin
Democratic Party members of the Wisconsin State Assembly
Mayors of places in Wisconsin
Businesspeople from Wisconsin
1864 births
1929 deaths